= Death of Hervé Bondembe Mandundu =

2016 police shooting in Switzerland

Hervé Bondembe Mandundu
- Died: November 6, 2016 (aged 27); Bex, Switzerland
- Cause of death: Gunshot
- Occupations: House Painter, Volunteer Firefighter
- Children: 1

Hervé Bondembe Mandundu (died November 6, 2016) was a 27-year-old Congolese-born Swiss resident who was shot and killed by Chablais police in Bex, Switzerland. The police allege that Mandundu rushed towards the five officers with a kitchen knife. The officer who killed Mandundu was later tried for murder and acquitted by the Court of First Instance and by the Court of Appeal on the grounds of self-defence.

The killing led to widespread criticism of excessive force from Swiss police. Protests against police brutality occurred in Lausanne at the time, and Mandundu's name has been invoked in later Swiss protests against police brutality and systemic racism.

Mandundu was the only one of his immediate family to not be born in Switzerland and was born in the Democratic Republic of the Congo. While not a Swiss citizen, Mandundu had lived in Switzerland since the age of 5.
